Tughan or Towghan may refer to:
 Tughan-e Baba Gorgor
 Tughan al-Nasiri, a Mamluk prince and warrior (d. 1415)

See also
 Toghan (disambiguation)